The 1977 Women's World Outdoor Bowls Championship  was held in Worthing, England, from 21 May to 5 June 1977.

Elsie Wilkie successfully defended her singles title which was held in a round robin format.

The pairs went to Hong Kong, the triples to Wales and the fours to Australia. The Taylor Trophy was won by the Australian team.

Medallists

Results

Women's singles – round robin

Women's pairs – round robin

Women's triples – round robin

Women's fours – round robin

Taylor Trophy

References

World Outdoor Bowls Championship
World
Bowls in England
1977 in British sport
May 1977 sports events in the United Kingdom
June 1977 sports events in the United Kingdom